The City of Victor Harbor is a local government area of South Australia. The council is responsible for the town of Victor Harbor, which contains over 85% of its population, and the surrounding rural area to the north and west. The City of Victor Harbor had an estimated population of over 14,000 at the 2016 Census.

History

The City, then known as the District Council of Victor Harbor, was the product of a merger on 31 October 1975 between the District Council of Encounter Bay and the Corporation of Victor Harbor.

In 1996–1997, a merger with the small neighbouring councils in Port Elliot and Goolwa, (which, with the town of Middleton, form a contiguous coastal conurbation with Victor Harbor), was considered, but ultimately the District Council of Victor Harbor remained distinct, and the other councils merged on 1 July 1997 to form the Alexandrina Council.

On 1 February 2000, the District Council of Victor Harbor was renamed as the City of Victor Harbor.

Council

The City has 10 councillors and no wards. Each councillor serves a four-year term; the last election was in November 2018; the next election is due in 2022.

The current council consists of:

Localities
The city consists of the following localities (also called suburbs):
 Back Valley
 Encounter Bay
 Hayborough 
 Hindmarsh Tiers
 Hindmarsh Valley
 Inman Valley
 Lower Inman Valley
 Mount Jagged
 McCracken
 Victor Harbor
 Waitpinga

See also
 List of parks and gardens in rural South Australia

References

External links
 City of Victor Harbor Website

Victor Harbor